An oil mill is a grinding mill designed to crush or bruise oil-bearing seeds, such as linseed or peanuts, or other oil-rich vegetable material, such as olives or the fruit of the oil palm, which can then be pressed to extract vegetable oils, which may used as foods or for cooking, as oleochemical feedstocks, as lubricants, or as biofuels.  The pomace or press cake – the remaining solid material from which the oil has been extracted – may also be used as a food or fertilizer.

History

Oil-rich vegetable materials have been processed mechanically to extract the valuable oils for thousands of years, typically using vertical millstones moving around a central post (edge runner stones or kollergangs in an edge mill) to crush or bruise the seeds or fruit which can then be stamped or pressed to extract the oil.  A treadmill, windmill or watermill was later used to drive the milling and pressing machinery, replaced in modern times with steam and later other power sources. Bullock or horse driven oil mills, such as the traditional ghani in Bangladesh, have increasingly been replaced by power-driven steel oil mills.

In some areas, watermills may be "double" water mills, with machinery for grinding wheat on one side of the watercourse and machinery for extracting oils on the other side.

Historical wind-driven oil mills could process between 100 and 200 tons of raw materials per year.

Modern oil mills

Modern mechanical oil mills can process up to 4,000 tons per day in hot pressing processes, and up to 25 tons per day cold pressed.  Industrial oil pressing methods usually use a screw to crush the raw materials in a continuous process, before extraction of the oil from the press cake using a centrifuge or a solvent such as hexane.

Edible oils may be extracted for culinary purposes.  Non-edible oils can be used in the manufacture of soaps, paints and varnishes, or as fuel for oil lamps.  Important feed stocks include soybeans, rapeseed (canola), sunflower seeds, cottonseed, and maize (corn), as well as peanuts, olives, various nuts, sesame seeds, safflower, grape seeds and flaxseed (linseed).  Palm oil is extracted from the pulp of the oil palm fruit, palm kernel oil from the kernel of the oil palm, and coconut oil from the kernel of the coconut.

See also

 Olive oil extraction

References

 Power from Wind: A History of Windmill Technology, Richard Leslie Hills, p. 67, 172-178]
 Water and Wind Power, Martin Watts, p. 55-56
 Windmills, Martin Watts, p. 46

Grinding mills
Food grinding tools